A list of films produced by the Ollywood film industry based in Bhubaneswar and Cuttack in the 1970s:

References

1970s
Ollywood
Films, Ollywood